The 497th Combat Training Flight is a United States Air Force unit.  Its present station is Singapore's Paya Lebar Air Base, where its mission is to provide operational and logistical support to U.S. Air Force fighter aircraft deployed to Singapore for training exercises with the Republic of Singapore Air Force.

History

World War II
Operational training unit, June 1942 – October 1943; replacement training, October 1943 – April 1944.

Cold War

Air defense of West coast, 1953–1955.

Air Defense of Southwest Europe, 1958–1964.  In the early 1960s Headquarters, United States Air Force (USAF) implemented Project Clearwater.  Clearwater was designed to return overseas Convair F-102 Delta Dagger squadrons stationed overseas to the United States to reduce "gold flow" (adverse balance of payments). This resulted in the 497th being reduced to a paper unit and its planes dispersed to Air Defense Command interceptor squadrons in the US. Although it had originally been intended to inactivate the unit, it was instead transferred to Tactical Air Command as a paper unit.

Vietnam War

Combat in Southeast Asia, 1965–1974; Defense of South Korea, 1974–1988.

Current mission
Combat training in Southeast Asia, 1991–present
Approximately three deployments of USAF McDonnell Douglas F-15 Eagles and General Dynamics F-16 Fighting Falcons from both active duty and Air National Guard units from around the world are made each year to Singapore under the auspices of Exercise Commando Sling. The squadron supports/participates in regional exercise and global contingencies, and provides housing; morale, recreation and welfare facilities and programs: medical services; force protection to resources and personnel; and legal, financial, communications, and contracting support to assigned and deployed personnel.

The 497th comprises the basic functional elements of a small-scale USAF fighter wing – fighter operations, flightline logistics, community and mission support, and medical services. With a permanently assigned staff of 37 personnel, the 497th represents the entire USAF presence in Singapore. However, six times a year for up to four weeks the unit grows to between 120 and 190 in strength, with the deployment of 6 to 12 F-15 and/or F-16 aircraft and the associated 75 to 150 support personnel. When so configured, the 497th "presence" is transformed into an operational role, to conduct an intense schedule of air-to-air combat training with the Republic of Singapore Air Force (RSAF).

The 497th also supports USAF fighter rotations to Southwest Asia and several other regional exercises such as Cope Taufan, Cope Tiger, and Cope West. An example of the 497th's "expanding capability" occurred in May 1998 during COMMANDO SLING 98-4 when they also supported the ordered departure of U.S. personnel from Indonesia. Paya Lebar Air Base ramp at that time had 28 USAF F-15s, four USAF Lockheed C-130 Herculeses, four USAF Boeing KC-135 Stratotankers, one Lockheed C-141 Starlifter, one Boeing C-17 Globemaster III, plus all the permanently based RSAF aircraft and aircraft from other nations. All were supported by squadron and RSAF personnel. Additionally, COMMANDO SLING 98-4 was the first time the normally bilateral exercise was expanded to include the Royal Australian Air Force F/A-18 Hornets.

The 497th commander is also the designated commanding officer for legal jurisdiction over U.S. military personnel in nine Southeast Asian countries. It is a tenant command under Naval Region Singapore and shares space at the Sembawang Terminal with Task Force 73/Commander, Logistics Group Western Pacific and a space at Paya Lebar Air Base.

Lineage
 Constituted as the 302d Bombardment Squadron (Light) on 13 January 1942
 Activated on 10 February 1942
 Redesignated 302d Bombardment Squadron (Dive) on 27 July 1942
 Redesignated 497th Fighter-Bomber Squadron on 10 August 1943
 Disbanded on 1 April 1944
 Reconstituted on 3 February 1953 and redesignated 497th Fighter-Interceptor Squadron
 Activated on 18 February 1953
 Redesignated 497th Tactical Fighter Squadron on 25 July 1964
 Inactivated on 16 September 1974
 Activated on 1 October 1978
 Inactivated on 24 January 1989
 Redesignated 497th Fighter Training Squadron on 28 October 1991
 Activated on 31 October 1991
 Redesignated 497th Combat Training Squadron on 1 August 1994
 Redesignated 497th Combat Training Flight on 26 October 2006

Assignments
 84th Bombardment Group (later 84th Fighter-Bomber Group), 10 February 1942 – 1 April 1944
 503d Air Defense Group, 18 February 1953
 84th Fighter Group, 18 August 1955
 65th Air Division, 5 July 1958
 United States Air Forces Europe (attached to 65th Air Division), 1 July 1960
 32d Tactical Fighter Wing. 18 June 1964
 8th Tactical Fighter Wing, 25 July 1964
 831st Air Division, 6 December 1965 (attached to 479th Tactical Fighter Wing)
 8th Tactical Fighter Wing, 8 December 1965 – 16 September 1974
 8th Tactical Fighter Wing, 1 October 1978
 51st Composite Wing (later 51st Tactical Fighter Wing), 1 January 1982 – 1 January 1988
 Thirteenth Air Force, 31 October 1991
 36th Air Base Wing, 30 June 2005
 36th Operations Group, 15 March 2006 – present

Stations

 Savannah Air Base, Georgia, 10 February 1942
 Drew Field, Florida, 7 February 1943
 Harding Army Air Field, Louisiana, 4 October 1943 – 1 April 1944
 Portland Army Air Base, Oregon, 18 February 1953
 Geiger Field, Washington, 18 August 1955
 Torrejon Air Base, Spain, 21 June 1958

 George Air Force Base, California, 18 June 1964
 Ubon Royal Thai Air Force Base, Thailand, 8 December 1965
 Taegu Air Base, South Korea, 1 October 1978 – 24 January 1989
 Paya Lebar Airbase, Singapore, 31 October 1991 – present

Aircraft

 V-72 Vengeance, 1942
 A-24 Banshee, 1942–1943
 P-39 Airacobra, 1943
 P-47 Thunderbolt, 1943–1944
 F-94B Starfire, 1953–1954
 F-89D Scorpion, 1954–1955
 F-86D Sabre Interceptor, 1955–1960
 Convair F-102 Delta Dagger, 1960–1964
 F-4 Phantom II, 1964–1988

References

Notes
 Explanatory notes

 Citations

Bibliography

 
 
 McMullen, Richard F. (1964) "The Fighter Interceptor Force 1962–1964"  ADC Historical Study No. 27, Air Defense Command, Ent Air Force Base, CO (Confidential, declassified 22 March 2000)

External links
497th Combat Training Squadron on the NRCS website
497th Combat Training Squadron on the US Embassy in Singapore website

Flights of the United States Air Force
Combat Training 0497
Singapore–United States military relations